The fifth season of the Russian reality talent show The Voice premiered on September 2, 2016 on Channel One with Polina Gagarina and Grigory Leps returned as coaches alongside Dima Bilan and Leonid Agutin, who returned after a one-season break. Dmitry Nagiev returned as the show's presenter. On December 30, 2016, Darya Antonyuk was crowned the winner of The Voice and Leonid Agutin became the winning coach for the first time ever. With Darya's win, the twenty-year-old became the youngest winner in the show's history.

Coaches and presenter

There are two changes to the coaching panel from season four. Dima Bilan and Leonid Agutin returned from their hiatus and rejoined Polina Gagarina and Grigory Leps.

Dmitry Nagiyev returns for his 5th season as a presenter.

Teams
Colour key

Blind auditions
A new feature this season are special episodes of the Blinds. Its include all the performances from the previous episode, and also its include the best performances of those Artists who didn't pass Blind auditions and whose performances were not shown in the previous episode.
Colour key

Episode 1 (Sep. 2)
The winners of previous seasons performed "Мелодия" and the coaches performed "Gimme All Your Lovin'" at the start of the show.

Episode 2 (Sep. 9)

Episode 2.1 (Sep. 10)

Episode 3 (Sep. 16)
Note: Alexander Gordon, a famous journalist, made a special performance with the song "In the Death Car". No coach turned for him.

Episode 3.1 (Sep. 17)

Episode 4 (Sep. 23)

Episode 4.1 (Sep. 24)

Episode 5 (Sep. 30)
Note: Maxim Galkin, a famous comedian and presenter, made a special performance with "The Magic Flute"'s aria "Soll ich dich, Teurer, nicht mehr sehn?". Dima and Polina turned for him.

Episode 5.1 (Oct. 1)

Episode 6 (Oct. 14)
Note: Inga Lepsveridze, Grigory Leps' daughter, made a special performance with the song "Not About Angels". No coach turned for her.

Episode 6.1 (Oct. 8)

Episode 7 (Oct. 14)
Note: Nikolay Baskov, a famous singer, made a special performance with the song "Il Mondo". Dima and Polina turned for him.

Episode 7.1 (Oct. 15)

The Battles
The Battles round started with episode 8 and ended with episode 11 (broadcast on 21, 28 October 2016, on 4, 11 November 2016). The coaches can steal two losing artists from another coach. Contestants who win their battle or are stolen by another coach will advance to the Knockout rounds.
Colour key

The Knockouts
The Knockouts round started with episode 12 and ended with episode 14 (broadcast on 18, 25 November 2016; on 2 December 2016).
The top 24 contestants will then move on to the "Live Shows."
Colour key

Live shows
Colour key:

Week 1, 2: Quarterfinals (9 and 16 December)
The Top 24 performed on Fridays, 9 and 16 December 2016. The two artists with the fewest votes from each team left the competition by the end of each episode.

Week 3: Semifinal (23 December) 
The Top 8 performed on Friday, 23 December 2016. One artist with the fewest votes from each team left the competition.

Week 4: Final (30 December) 
The Top 4 performed on Friday, 30 December 2016. This week, the four finalists performed two solo cover songs and a duet with their coach.

Reception

Rating

References

The Voice (Russian TV series)
2016 Russian television seasons